Rebecca Pronsky (born September 4, 1980) is a singer-songwriter from Brooklyn, New York. Her musical style combines folk, jazz, alternative, and country elements. She has been described as having "a voice that's full of character, sensitive and rich", and as writing songs that are "short and sharp... stimulating and catchy".

Early life
Pronsky was born in Brooklyn, New York City and began professional vocal training at the age of eight. In 1996 she met Lucy Wainwright Roche, then a fellow high school student at Saint Ann's School. Wainwright Roche introduced her to folk music and Pronsky began to study guitar. Pronsky attended Brown University and graduated in 2002 with a degree in Ethnomusicology. However, it wasn't until she left college that she considered music to be a serious career option.

Musical career
Pronsky recorded several songs she had written while in college upon graduating and released this collection as her first demo Milestone in 2002. She moved back to Brooklyn soon after and began working with other musicians to explore her sound more fully. She met Rich Bennett (Friendly Bears, Monocle, Rich Bennett) in 2003 and the two began a musical collaboration.

In 2005, Pronsky created the Brooklyn Songwriters Exchange, a music series presenting strong local songwriters in the New York City area.

Pronsky worked with Bennett for the next few years, culminating in Departures & Arrivals (2007). Pronsky's first full-length album, it was produced by Bennett and Pronsky, and released by indie label Nine Mile Records. Pronsky spoke of the record as being "much more compositional" than her earlier work. Departures & Arrivals was followed by a limited edition EP The Best Game in Town in 2009.

Nine Mile Records released Pronsky's second and third full-length albums: Viewfinder in 2011 and Only Daughter in 2013. Both records were mixed by Scott Solter. Viewfinder was recorded at the Great North Sound Society in Parsonsfield, Maine with engineer Sam Kassirer.  The album explores themes of loss and coming of age, as well as the economic downturn. Track 1 "Hard Times" was featured on Song of the Day on NPR Music, on April 18, 2011, due to its topical relevance. Only Daughter is the first album solely produced by Bennett and features a dreamier, dark sound. Lyrically, the album is abstract and deals with the themes of political corruption and personal struggle.

Pronsky has toured extensively in the US, UK and Europe. She has been the supporting act on shows featuring Shawn Colvin, Steve Forbert, Peter Case, Catie Curtis, Sarah Bettens, Josh Ritter, Loudon Wainwright III, Patty Larkin, and Caroline Herring among others.

Discography
2020 Candidate Jams (2020; US; Acme Hall Studios)

Witness: Hillary's Song Cycle (2017; US: self-released)

Known Objects (2016; US; Acme Hall Recordings)

Only Daughter (2013; US; Nine Mile Records)

Viewfinder (2011; US; Nine Mile Records)

The Best Game in Town (2009; limited edition EP: US; Nine Mile Records)

Departures & Arrivals (2007; US; Nine Mile Records)

The Early Hours (2004; EP, US; self-released)

Personal life
Pronsky is married to her musical partner Rich Bennett.

References

External links
 Official website
 Nine Mile Records

1980 births
Living people
21st-century American guitarists
21st-century American women guitarists
21st-century American women singers
American women singer-songwriters
Brown University alumni
Guitarists from New York City
Musicians from Brooklyn
Saint Ann's School (Brooklyn) alumni
Singers from New York City
21st-century American singers
Singer-songwriters from New York (state)